The Hard Tour was a concert tour by Swedish singer Tove Styrke in support of her fourth studio album Hard (2022). The tour began on 23 September 2022 in Jönköping, Sweden, and concluded on 16 February 2023 in Berlin, Germany, comprising 28 shows throughout three legs in Europe and North America.

Shows

Cancelled shows

References

2022 concert tours
2023 concert tours
Tove Styrke concert tours
Concert tours of North America
Concert tours of the United States
Concert tours of Europe
Concert tours of Sweden
Concert tours of Denmark
Concert tours of the United Kingdom
Concert tours of Ireland
Concert tours of Belgium
Concert tours of Germany
Concert tours of France
Concert tours of the Netherlands